Conocephalus conocephalus is the type species of the conehead genus Conocephalus and the bush cricket tribe Conocephalini.  This species has been recorded from southern Europe, including France, and Africa.
Described by Carl von Linné in 1767, C. conocephalus appears to have no surviving type specimens, although it is believed that material may have been obtained from Africa.

References

External links 
 

Conocephalinae
Orthoptera of Africa
Orthoptera of Europe